The Wild Hunt is a 2009 Canadian horror film produced and directed by Alexandre Franchi and starring Mark Antony Krupa, Ricky Mabe, and Kaniehtiio Horn.

Plot
Erik Magnusson and his girlfriend Evelyn have a falling out, in part due to stress from Erik's dying, incoherent father. She leaves to live in a live action role-playing game whose characters such as Celts, elves and Vikings are derived from the Middle Ages. Murtagh, the leader of a group within the game, wants Evelyn to participate in the Wild Hunt, a ritual that, if successful, will give his players a significant advantage in an upcoming mass battle.

Erik pursues Evelyn only to disrupt the game's proceedings. Erik partners with his estranged brother Bjorn and other players and referees on a quest to find Evelyn. He rescues her from the Wild Hunt and the two are reconciled, despite Murtagh's efforts to persuade her to come back.

Having lost Evelyn and been humiliated by Erik, Murtagh snaps and ritually cuts off his gamer wrist band. He leads his followers in a vicious assault on the main camp, injuring people and killing Erik. Murtagh flees, witnessing Evelyn commit suicide as he escapes through the woods.

Days later, Bjorn breaks into Murtagh's home and beats him to death.

Cast

 Mark Antony Krupa – Bjorn Magnusson
 Ricky Mabe – Erik Magnusson
 Kaniehtiio Horn – Evelyn / Princess Evlynia
 Trevor Hayes – Shaman Murtagh
 Kent McQuaid – Greg'Ash
 Nicolas Wright – King Argyle
 Claudia Jurt – Tamara (referee)
 Kyle Gatehouse – David
 Spiro Malandrakis – Oliver (referee)
 Victor Andrés Trelles Turgeon – Miguel / The Mexican Viking
 Holly O'Brien – Princess Ambrosia
 Martin Stone – Magnus Gunnarsson
 Terry Simpson – Bernie / Captain BernHeart

Production
The Wild Hunt is the first feature-length film by Montreal producer-director Alexandre Franchi. The production was based on 35mm film with an estimated $500,000 budget.

Release
The film was screened in September 2009 at the 2009 Toronto International Film Festival, where it won the award for Best Canadian First Feature Film. It was presented at the Slamdance Film Festival in January 2010 where it received an Audience Sparky Award for Best Narrative Film.

Reception
National Post film reviewer Chris Knight rated the film at 3 stars, noting Claudia Jurt's role presented the "strongest link in this chain-mail tale". The Toronto Star review considered the film an "impressive achievement" but noted that technical flaws in editing, lighting and camera usage detracted from the plot and that the production should have been better funded. The Montreal Gazette gave a very positive review calling the low-budget film "[m]iraculously shot".

Along with the aforementioned wins at the 2009 Toronto International Film Festival and the 2010 Slamdance Film Festival, the film received three Genie Award nominations at the 31st Genie Awards. Patricia McNeil was nominated for Best Costume Design, Claudine Sauvé was nominated for Best Cinematography, and Hélène-Manon Poudrette was nominated for Best Makeup.

References

External links
 
 The Wild Hunt DVD review on HEAVEmedia

2009 films
2000s horror drama films
Canadian horror drama films
Films directed by Alexandre Franchi
2009 directorial debut films
English-language Canadian films
2000s English-language films
2000s Canadian films